The Eton Choirbook (Eton College MS. 178) is a richly illuminated manuscript collection of English sacred music composed during the late 15th century.  It was one of very few collections of Latin liturgical music to survive the Reformation, and hence is an important source. It originally contained music by 24 different composers; however, many of the pieces are damaged or incomplete.  It is one of three large choirbooks surviving from early-Tudor England (the others are the Lambeth Choirbook and the Caius Choirbook).

The Choirbook was compiled between approximately 1500 and 1505 for use at Eton College; its present binding dates from the mid 16th century.  126 folios remain of the original 224, including the index.  In the original, there were a total of 93 separate compositions; however only 64 remain either complete or in part.  Some of the 24 composers are known only because of their inclusion in the Eton Choirbook.  John Browne has the most compositions (10), followed by Richard Davy (9) and Walter Lambe (8).

Stylistically, the music contained in the Eton Choirbook shows three phases in the development of early Renaissance polyphony in England.  The first phase is represented by the music of Richard Hygons, William Horwood and Gilbert Banester.  Most of the music of this early phase is polyphonic but non-imitative, with contrast achieved by alternation of full five-voice texture with sections sung by fewer voices.  The second phase, which includes music by John Browne, Richard Davy and Walter Lambe, uses imitation, cantus firmus techniques, and frequent cross-relations (a feature which was to become a distinctive sound in early Tudor polyphony).  The final phase represented in the choirbook includes music by William Cornysh and Robert Fayrfax, composed around 1500.  Points of imitation are frequent, cantus firmus techniques disappear, and in general the sound of the music is more Continental.

Contents

All of the compositions in the book are sacred vocal music in Latin. According to the index, it initially contained 93 works. However, part of its content was lost and only 64 works have survived, a few of them incomplete. They consist of:
 54 motets
 9 Magnificats
 1 Passion

The following inventory represents the contents as enumerated by the index, with folio numbers for the works that survive.
 1.  f. 1v-4: O Maria salvatoris mater - John Browne (i)
 2.  f. 4v-8: Gaude flore virginali - Hugh Kellyk
 3.  f. 8v-9v: O Maria plena gratiae - Walter Lambe
 4.  f. 10-11: Gaude flore virginali - Richard Davy
 5.  f. 11v-14: Stabat mater dolorosa - ?John Browne (ii)
 6.  f. 14v: O regina caelestis gloriae - Walter Lambe
 7.  f. 15-17: Stabat virgo mater Christi - ?John Browne (i)
 8.  f. 17v-19: Stabat juxta Christi crucem - ?John Browne (i)
 9.  f. 19v-22: O regina mundi clara - ?John Browne (i)
 10.  f. 22v-25: Gaude virgo mater Christi - Sturton
 11.  f. 25v: O virgo prudentissima - Robert Wilkinson [incomplete]
 12.  missing: Gaude flore virginali - Robert Wilkinson
 13.  missing: Salve regina vas mundiciae - Fawkner
 14.  f. 26: Gaude flore virginali - William Cornysh (senior) [incomplete]
 15.  f. 26v-29: Salve regina mater misericordiae - Robert Wilkinson
 16.  f. 29v-30: Salve regina mater misericordiae - William Brygeman
 17.  f. 30v-32: Salve regina mater misericordiae - William Horwood
 18.  f. 32v-34: Salve regina mater misericordiae - Richard Davy
 19.  f. 34v-36: Salve regina mater misericordiae - ?William Cornysh (senior)
 20.  f. 36v-38: Salve regina mater misericordiae - ?John Browne (ii)
 21.  f. 038v-40: Salve regina mater misericordiae - Walter Lambe
 22.  f. 40v-042: Salve regina mater misericordiae - John Sutton
 23.  f. 42v-44: Salve regina mater misericordiae - Robert Hacomplaynt
 24.  f. 44v-46: Salve regina mater misericordiae - Nicholas Huchyn
 25.  f. 46v-48: Salve regina mater misericordiae - Robert Wilkinson
 26.  f. 48v-50: Salve regina mater misericordiae - Robert Fayrfax
 27.  f. 50v-52: Salve regina mater misericordiae - Richard Hygons
 28.  f. 52v-54: Salve regina mater misericordiae - ?John Browne (i)
 29.  f. 54v-56: Salve regina mater misericordiae - John Hampton
 30.  f. 56v-59: O Domine caeli terraeque creator - Richard Davy
 31.  f. 59v-62: Salve Jesu mater vera - Richard Davy
 32.  f. 62v-65: Stabat mater dolorosa - Richard Davy
 33.  f. 65v-68: Virgo templum trinitatis - Richard Davy
 34.  f. 68v-71: In honore summae matris - Richard Davy
 35.  f. 71v-74: O Maria et Elisabeth - Gilbert Banester
 36.  f. 74v-76: Gaude flore virginali - William Horwood
 37.  f. 76v-77v: Gaude virgo mater Christi - William Horwood
 38.  missing: O regina caelestis gloriae - Walter Lambe
 39.  missing: Gaude flore virginali - Walter Lambe
 40.  missing: Virgo gaude gloriosa - Walter Lambe
 41.  missing: Stabat mater dolorosa - Robert Fayrfax
 42.  missing: Ave cuius conceptio - Robert Fayrfax
 43.  missing: Quid cantemus innocentes - Robert Fayrfax
 44.  missing: Gaude flore virginali - John Dunstaple
 45.  missing: Ave lux totius mundi - ?John Browne (i)
 46.  missing: Gaude flore virginali - ?John Browne (i)
 47.  missing: Stabat mater dolorosa - ?William Cornysh (senior)
 48.  f. 78-80: Stabat mater dolorosa - ?William Cornysh (senior)
 49.  f. 80v-82: Gaude virgo salutata - Fawkner
 50.  f. 82v-85: Gaude rosa sine spina - Fawkner
 51.  f. 85v-87: Gaude flore virginali - Edmund Turges
 52.  f. 87v-88: Nesciens mater virgo virum - Walter Lambe
 53.  f. 88v: Salve decus castitatis - Robert Wilkinson
 54.  f. 89: Ascendit Christus hodie - Nicholas Huchyn
 55.  f. 89v-91v: O mater venerabilis - ?John Browne (i)
 56.  missing: Ad te purissima virgo - ?William Cornysh (senior)
 57.  f. 92v-93v: Ave lumen gratiae - Robert Fayrfax
 58.  missing: O virgo virginum praeclara - Walter Lambe
 59.  f. 94-95: Gaude virgo mater Christi - Robert Wilkinson
 60.  f. 95v-97: Stabat virgo mater Christi - ?John Browne (i)
 61.  f. 97v-99: Stella caeli extirpavit que lactavit - Walter Lambe
 62.  f. 99v-101: Ascendit Christus hodie - Walter Lambe
 63.  f. 101v-103: Gaude flore virginali - Walter Lambe
 64.  f. 103v-105: Gaude flore virginali - Edmund Turges
 65.  f. 105v-106: Ave Maria mater Dei - ?William Cornysh (senior)
 66.  f. 106v-108: Gaude virgo mater Christi - ?William Cornysh (senior)
 67.  f. 108v-110v: Gaude virgo salutata - Holynborne
 68.  missing: Magnificat: Et exultavit spiritus meus - John Browne (i)
 69.  missing: Magnificat: Et exultavit spiritus meus - Richard Davy
 70.  f. 111: Magnificat: Et exultavit spiritus meus - John Nesbet
 71.  f. 111v-113: Magnificat: Et exultavit spiritus meus - William Horwood
 72.  f. 113v-116: Magnificat: Et exultavit spiritus meus - Hugh Kellyk
 73.  f. 116v-118: Magnificat: Et exultavit spiritus meus - Walter Lambe
 74.  f. 118v: Magnificat: Et exultavit spiritus meus - John Browne (i)
 75.  missing: Magnificat: Et exultavit spiritus meus - Robert Fayrfax
 76.  missing: Magnificat: Et exultavit spiritus meus - William Brygeman
 77.  missing: Magnificat: Et exultavit spiritus meus - Robert Wilkinson
 78.  missing: Magnificat: Et exultavit spiritus meus - Robert Mychelson
 79.  f. 119-119v: Magnificat: Et exultavit spiritus meus - Robert Wilkinson
 80.  missing: Magnificat: Et exultavit spiritus meus - William Cornysh (Junior)
 81.  missing: Magnificat: Et exultavit spiritus meus - John Browne (i)
 82.  f. 120-120v: Magnificat: Et exultavit spiritus meus - John Sygar
 83.  missing: Magnificat: Et exultavit spiritus meus - John Browne (i)
 84.  missing: Magnificat: Et exultavit spiritus meus - Edmund Turges
 85.  missing: Magnificat: Et exultavit spiritus meus - Edmund Turges
 86.  missing: Magnificat: Et exultavit spiritus meus - John Baldwin
 87.  missing: Magnificat: Et exultavit spiritus meus - John Sygar
 88.  missing: Magnificat: Et exultavit spiritus meus - John Baldwin
 89.  missing: Magnificat: Et exultavit spiritus meus - Edmund Turges
 90.  f. 121: Magnificat: Et exultavit spiritus meus - Richard Davy
 91.  f. 121v-123: Magnificat: Et exultavit spiritus meus - William Stratford
 92.  f. 124-126: Passio Domini - Richard Davy
 93.  f. 126v: Jesus autem transiens - Robert Wilkinson

The composers represented in the manuscript are: John Browne (10 works), Richard Davy (9), Walter Lambe (8), Robert Wilkinson (7), William Cornysh (5), William Horwood (4), Robert Fayrfax (2), John Fawkyner (2), Nicholas Huchyn (2), Hugh Kellyk (2), Edmund Turges (2), Gilbert Banester, Brygeman (1), Robert Hacomplaynt (1), John Hampton (1), Holynborne (1), Richard Hygons (1), Nesbet (1), Edmund Sturton (1), John Sutton (1), Sygar (1) and William Stratford (1).

Other composers as Baldwyn, John Dunstable and Mychelson also appear in the index, but their works were lost.

Sources
 Harold Gleason and Warren Becker, Music in the Middle Ages and Renaissance (Music Literature Outlines Series I).  Bloomington, Indiana.  Frangipani Press, 1986.  
 "Sources, MS, Renaissance Polyphony", from Grove Music Online ed. L. Macy (Accessed April 24, 2005), (subscription access) 
 Gustave Reese, Music in the Renaissance.  New York, W.W. Norton & Co., 1954.

Recordings
 The Rose and The Ostrich Feather, Eton Choirbook Volume I.  Harry Christophers:  The Sixteen.  CORO:  CD COR16026.
 The Crown of Thorns, Eton Choirbook Volume II.  Harry Christophers:  The Sixteen.  CORO:  CD COR16012.
 The Pillars Of Eternity, Eton Choirbook Volume III.  Harry Christophers:  The Sixteen.  CORO:  CD COR16022.
 The Flower of All Virginity, Eton Choirbook Volume IV.  Harry Christophers:  The Sixteen.  CORO:  CD COR16018.
 Voices of Angels, Eton Choirbook Volume V.  Harry Christophers:  The Sixteen.  CORO:  CD COR16002.
 More Divine Than Human: Music from The Eton Choir Book, vol 1. Stephen Darlington: Choir of Christ Church Cathedral Oxford. Avie: AV2167.
 Courts of Heaven: Music from The Eton Choirbook, vol 3. Stephen Darlington: Choir of Christ Church Cathedral Oxford. Avie.
 Music from the Eton Choirbook, Tonus Peregrinus, Antony Pitts, Dir. Naxos 8.572840
 Eton Choirbook, Record 2. Purcell Consort of Voices, Choristers of All Saints, Margaret Street, Dir. Grayston Burgess. Vinyl LP, Argo ZRG 557.
 Richard Davy: Passion According To St. Matthew. (Eton Choirbook, Record 1). Purcell Consort of Voices, Choristers of All Saints, Margaret Street, Dir. Grayston Burgess. Vinyl LP, Argo ZRG 558.
 The Eton Choirbook Huelgas Ensemble, Dir. Paul Van Nevel. 2012 DHM: CD 88765408852.

Bibliography
Benham, Hugh: Latin Church Music in England c. 1460-1575 (London, 1977), 58ff, passim [CCM descriptor(s): DpLpTpFpDis]
Bent, Margaret; Bent, Ian; Trowell, Brian (eds.): John Dunstable complete works, Musica Britannica Vol. VIII (London, 1970) [2nd revised edn], X-XII
Bent, Margaret; Bent, Ian: 'Dufay, Dunstable, Plummer-A New Source' Journal of the American Musicological Society XXII (1969), 394 - 424
Blume, Friedrich (ed.): Die Musik in Geschichte und Gegenwart: Allgemeine Enzyklopädie der Musik (Kassel, 1949–79) [Cited by volume and column number], II, 1591-5, Tafel 48
Cheung, Vincent C.K., Tudor Dedications to the Blessed Virgin: History, Style, and Analysis of Music from the Eton Choirbook.  
Curtis, Gareth; Wathey, Andrew: 'Fifteenth-Century English Liturgical Music: A List of the Surviving Repertory' RMA Research Chronicle 27 (1994), 1-69
Fitch, Fabrice: 'Hearing John Browne's motets: registral space in the music of the Eton Choirbook', Early Music 36(1) (2008), 19-40
Harrison, Frank Ll.: Music in Medieval Britain (London, 1963), 307-29
Harrison, Frank Llewellyn: 'The Eton Choirbook: Its Background and Contents (Eton College Library ms. 178)' Annales Musicologiques I (1953), 151-75
Harrison, Frank Llewellyn: 'The Eton College Choirbook (Eton College MS 178)', in International Musicological Society:  Report of the 4th Congress, Utrecht 1952 (1952), 224-32
Heminger, A. Music Theory at Work: The Eton Choirbook, Rhythmic Proportions and Musical Networks in Sixteenth-Century England. Early Music History, 37, (2018) 141-182. 
Hughes, Dom Anselm: 'The Eton Manuscript' Proceedings of the Royal Musical Association LIII (1926-7), 67-83
James, Montague Rhodes: A Descriptive Catalogue of the Manuscripts in the Library of Eton College (Cambridge, 1895), 108-12
Kirsch, Winfried: Die Quellen der mehrstimmigen Magnificat- und Te Deum Vertonungen bis zur Mitte des 16. Jahrhunderts (Tutzing, 1966), 135
Phillips, Peter: 'Performance Practice in l0th-Century English Choral Music' Early Music VI (1978), 195-9 [CCM descriptor(s): FpDis]
Phillips, Peter: 'Eton encounters; reflections on the Choirbook'. Musical Times 1939 (2017), 3-60.
Sandon, Nicholas: 'Fragments of Medieval Polyphony at Canterbury Cathedral' Musica Disciplina XXX (1976), 37-53, 51-3
Squire, W. Barclay: 'On an early Sixteenth Century MS. of English Music in the Library of Eton College' Archaeologia LVI (1898), 89-102
Warren, Edwin B.: Life and Works of Robert Fayrfax, MSD Vol. 22 (American Institute of Musicology, 1969), 42
Westrup, J. A.; et al.,  (eds.): New Oxford History of Music (London, New York, and Toronto, 1954-), III, Plate III
Williams, Carol J.: 'The Salve Regina Settings in the Eton Choirbook' Miscellanea Musicologica [Adelaide] X (1979), 28-37 [CCM descriptor(s): LpDis]
Williamson, Magnus: The Eton Choirbook, Facsimile with introductory study (Oxford: DIAMM Publications, 2010)
For a comprehensive description of the MS see Digital Image Archive of Medieval Music

External links
The Eton Choirbook on hoasm.org
Free access to high-resolution images of this manuscript from Digital Image Archive of Medieval Music
Playlist of available works from the Eton Choirbook on American Spotify
List of contents of Eton Choirbook (published in Musica Britannica, Vols. X, XI and XII)
 
 

1500s books
16th-century illuminated manuscripts
Music illuminated manuscripts
Renaissance music
Books on English music
Renaissance music manuscript sources
Eton College